Louis Riel Arts and Technology Centre also commonly referred to as ATC, is a vocational high school in Winnipeg, Manitoba, Canada with an enrolment of 284 students as of 2020.

References

External links
ATC's Website
Louis Riel School Division Website

High schools in Winnipeg
Educational institutions established in 2002
2002 establishments in Manitoba